Melvyn I. Cronin (June 13, 1898 – May 9, 1977) was a United States politician.

Cronin was born in San Francisco in 1898 and worked in the city's Park and Recreation Department where as a youth he taught baseball to his cousin Joe Cronin of later Boston Red Sox fame. He graduated from St. Ignatius College, later the University of San Francisco, with a degree in law and started a partnership with controversial lawyer Vincent Hallinan. During World War I he served in the United States Army.  He was later a member of the California State Assembly for the 27th and 25th district, but resigned from the California State Assembly on January 4, 1942. From 1953 to 1977, he was a Judge of the California Superior Court, and served in San Francisco as Judge of the Juvenile Court under the Superior Court of California. He was concurrently a member of the California Judicial Council. He died in San Francisco County in 1977.

References

United States Army personnel of World War I
Law in the San Francisco Bay Area
People from the San Francisco Bay Area
1898 births
1977 deaths
20th-century American politicians
20th-century American judges
Democratic Party members of the California State Assembly